The U.S. Post Office-Langdon, also known as Langdon Post Office, in Langdon, North Dakota, United States, is a post office building that was built in 1937.  It was listed on the National Register of Historic Places in 1989.

References

Government buildings completed in 1937
Post office buildings on the National Register of Historic Places in North Dakota
National Register of Historic Places in Cavalier County, North Dakota
Stripped Classical architecture in the United States
1937 establishments in North Dakota